The Serbian eagle is a double-headed heraldic eagle, a common symbol in the history of Serbian heraldry and vexillology. The double-headed eagle and the Serbian cross are the main heraldic symbols which represent the national identity of the Serbian people across the centuries. It originated from the medieval Nemanjić dynasty. The eagle, defaced with the cross, has been used in the contemporary design of the coat of arms of Serbia following the tradition established by the Kingdom of Serbia in 1882.

The Order of the White Eagle was a royal order awarded Serbian and Yugoslav citizens for achievements in peace or war, or for special merits to the Crown, the state and nation, between 1883 and 1945.

History

Middle Ages
The double-headed eagle was adopted in medieval Serbia from its use as an imperial symbol in the Byzantine Empire.

The oldest preserved Nemanjić dynasty double-headed eagle in historical sources is depicted on the ktetor portrait of Miroslav of Hum in the Church of St. Peter and Paul in Bijelo Polje, dating to 1190. It had the following characteristics: one neck and two heads, collars on the neck and tail, spread wings, a tail in the shape of fleur-de-lis, heads higher than wings, feet have three toes, the eagle is within a circle. This type of Nemanjić eagle developed between the 12th and 15th centuries. It was very different from the German eagle: two necks, no collars, tail is leaf-shaped, heads are lower than wings, four toes, unspread wings. The Nemanjić double-headed eagle (with the specific characteristics) was depicted on the details of ornaments and textile in the Žiča monastery (1207–20), in the Church of Our Lady of Ljeviš (1307–10), the decoration of Jovan Oliver's clothing (1349), detail on textile from Veluće Monastery (14th c.), a detail in the Resava Monastery (1402–27), on the plate of Ivan Crnojević's coat of arms, as well as in other monasteries and churches.

Beginning in the 14th century, the double-headed eagle can be seen more often on inscriptions, medieval frescoes and embroidery on the clothes of Serbian royalty. The Serbian Church adopted it, with the entrance of Žiča, the seat of the Serbian Archbishopric in the 1219–53 period, and by tradition the coronation church of the Serbian kings, was engraved with the double-headed eagle. The survived golden ring of Queen Teodora (1321–22) has the symbol engraved. During the reign of Emperor Stefan Dušan (r. 1331–55), the double-headed eagle can be seen on everyday objects and state related documents, such as wax stamps and decrees. In 1339, map maker, Angelino Dulcert, marked the Serbian Empire with a flag with a red double-headed eagle.

Other Serbian dynasties also adopted the symbol as a symbolic continuation, like the Mrnjavčević and Lazarević. Prince Lazar (r. 1371–89), when renovating the Hilandar monastery of Mount Athos, engraved the double-headed eagle at the northern wall. The Codex Monacensis Slavicus 4 ( 1371–89) has richly attested artwork of the Serbian eagle.  The double-headed eagle was officially adopted by Stefan Lazarević after he received the despot title, the second highest Byzantine title, by John VII Palaiologos in August 1402 at the court in Constantinople.

The double-headed eagle was used in several coats of arms found in the Illyrian Armorials, compiled in the early modern period. The white double-headed eagle on a red shield was used for the Nemanjić dynasty, and the Despot Stefan Lazarević. A "Nemanjić eagle" was used at the crest of the Hrebeljanović (Lazarević dynasty), while a half-white half-red eagle was used at the crest of the Mrnjavčević.

Modern and contemporary period
 
After the Ottoman invasion and subsequent occupation that lasted until the early 19th century, the double-headed eagle was forbidden to be used as it was a symbol of Serbian sovereignty and statehood. The Serbian cross; with four fire-steels ("ocila") came into greater use as another symbol of Serbs as it also was used in the Middle Ages. The emblem has mostly been depicted as a white eagle (beli orao, pl. beli orlovi) since 1804, when Gavrilović issued a revolutionary flag based on the Nemanyid eagle in Stemmatographia. 

The Serbian Revolution resurrected the Nemanjić tradition, and the white double-headed eagle became the symbol of Serbia as the coat of arms following independence from the Ottoman Empire. The Serbian cross has been used as the shield with the Serbian eagle in the contemporary design of the coat of arms of Serbia, following the tradition established by the Kingdom of Serbia of 1882. 

The coat of arms of 1882 has a white double-headed eagle, but not the Nemanjić type, but a German one, despite the fact that it symbolizes heritage of the Nemanjić; the mistake was made by the illustrator of the coat of arms, Von Schtrel (a German), who "cheated" Stojan Novaković (a Serbian reputable historian and minister) and used the German-style eagle instead of the Nemanjić eagle.

It was part of the family coat of arms of both Serbian dynasties, the Obrenović and Karađorđević.

The Order of the White Eagle was a royal order awarded Serbian and Yugoslav citizens for achievements in peace or war, or for special merits to the Crown, the state and nation, between 1883 and 1945.

Gallery

Use in modern municipalities

See also

Serbia national football team, nicknamed "the Eagles" (Orlovi)

References

Sources

National symbols of Serbia
Serbian heraldry
Heraldic eagles
Imperial Eagle